Mozaiq may refer to:

 MozaIQ (magazine), Serbian magazine published by Serbian Mensa
 Mozaiq (album), the fourth studio album by the metal band, Blood Stain Child